Peričnik Falls is a waterfall in Triglav National Park, Slovenia.

Geography
Peričnik Falls is one of the best-known waterfalls in Slovenia. It flows from a hanging valley in Triglav National Park into the glacial Vrata Valley, where the water of Peričnik Creek then flows into Bistrica Creek. There are actually two waterfalls: Upper Peričnik Falls (high) and Lower Peričnik Falls (high). The larger, lower waterfall is usually simply known as Peričnik Falls. A view of both falls is possible by crossing Bistrica Creek and ascending the scree slope a few dozen meters.

Name
The name Peričnik (in the local dialect also Perečnik) is ultimately derived from the verb prati, which originally meant 'to strike, beat'. It also refers to water falling over a steep cliff (cf. also Peračica), and in standard Slovene has also developed into the sense 'to wash clothing' (via the sense 'to beat laundry').

References

External links

Peričnik Falls on Geopedia
 Surround photography. Burger.si.

Waterfalls of Slovenia
Triglav National Park
Municipality of Kranjska Gora
WPeričnik